Christopher Vincent Stanich (1902–1987) was a New Zealand master mariner, harbourmaster and waterfront controller. He was born in Sydney, New South Wales, Australia in 1902.

References

1902 births
1987 deaths
New Zealand sailors
Australian emigrants to New Zealand